Volker Roth (born 1 February 1942 in Salzgitter) is a retired football referee from Germany. He is mostly known for supervising two matches in the 1986 FIFA World Cup in Mexico. After retirement he became a referee's advisor for UEFA.

References

External links
 Profile at worldfootball.net

1942 births
People from Salzgitter
German football referees
FIFA World Cup referees
Living people
1986 FIFA World Cup referees
UEFA Euro 1984 referees
Sportspeople from Lower Saxony